Kavian (also Romanized as Kāvīān; also known as Gābnān, Gāv Nān, and Govnān) is a village in Oshtorjan Rural District, in the Central District of Falavarjan County, Isfahan Province, Iran. At the 2006 census, its population was 1,795, in 495 families.

References 

Populated places in Falavarjan County